Susan Su or Su Wen (born December 31, 1985) is a Hong Kong model,  banker and beauty pageant participant in Miss Hong Kong 2011.

Personal life
Su was born in China on 31 December 1987. She is a single child in her family. Su completed university in Peking University in Beijing, where she was major in International Studies and Economics with Justin Yifu Lin as one of her faculty mentors. Su also studied at the Chinese University of Hong Kong in Hong Kong.

Su is a member of Hong Kong Mensa International club.

Her hobbies include Guzheng, volleyball, painting and swimming.

Pageant
In 2011, Su competed in the Miss Hong Kong Pageant as contestant #8. At one of the events leading up to the pageant, she won praise for her jewellery presentation and was rumoured to be a contender.  However she did not win the pageant and did not place in the top 3. Su decided to continue her office job in the financial industry.

Modeling life
She is currently a signed model/influencer of Primo Management Limited.

Career
After participating in the pageant, Su continued her career life in the finance industry.  She has worked for Hong Kong and Shanghai Bank Corporation (HSBC), Credit Suisse and Blackstone Group.

External links
 at Official Miss Hong Kong 2011 website
 2011香港小姐珠寶首飾試戴會
susanwensu at Sina Weibo
 Primo Management Limited (ex-Elite Model Management)

1987 births
Living people
TVB
Mensans
Hong Kong female models
Peking University alumni
Hong Kong bankers
Miss Hong Kong Pageants